Grahan (English: Eclipse) is a 2001 film directed by Shashilal K. Nair, starring Jackie Shroff, Manisha Koirala and Raghuvaran. The film follows the story of Parvati, a rape victim who quests for justice, and learns that it is not such a simple task.

Synopsis
The widowed Chief Minister Jagdish Acharya lives an opulent lifestyle along with his daughter, Sunita and son, Sanjay. One day he gets a phone call from the Police Commissioner informing him that a woman named Parvati has filed a F.I.R. (First Information Report) of rape against Sanjay. A shocked Jagdish instructs the Police Commissioner to proceed according to law. Soon after, while touring, Jagdish has a heart attack and dies. Sunita is asked to be the new Chief Minister and she accepts.

After the funeral the Police arrest Sanjay, hold him in a cell, and try him in court. Sunita's boyfriend, advocate Jaggan Sinha, whose brother, Raghu, is also a lawyer, represents Sanjay. Jaggan examines the evidence, witnesses and the complainant. He proves that the complaint was politically motivated by a journalist named Vidyarthi and that there was no evidence of rape. The Judge rules in favour of Sanjay and he is set free.

While the Archarya family celebrates Sanjay's release, Parvati's ensuing marriage with Bhaskar is called off by his parents and relatives due to the stigma on Parvati.

In the meanwhile, Jaggan finds out that Sanjay did indeed abduct and rape Parvati. Jaggan decides to reopen the case, much to the chagrin of Sunita and her brother. Sunita decides to support her brother and breaks-off with Jaggan.

Jaggan takes on the responsibility of caring for Parvati and takes her to a far off country house and also gets her mentally treated for her trauma. Parvati recovers and returns to the city.

She learns of the swearing-in ceremony of Sanjay and shoots at him during the ceremony. Parvati is arrested and jailed. Sunita does not want Jaggan to defend Parvati but Jaggan goes ahead and fights the case and wins it: Sanjay had died due to heart attack and not due to Parvati's shot.  Parvati is acquitted and Bhaskar accepts Parvati and they get married. Jaggan and Sunita also reconcile.

Cast
 Jackie Shroff as  Advocate Jaggan 'Jaggu' Sinha
 Manisha Koirala as  Parvati 'Paro' Shastri
 Anupama Verma as Sunita J. Acharya
 Prasad Purandare as  Sanjay Jagdish Acharya
 Raghuvaran as Advocate Raghu Sinha
 Raj Zutshi as Bhaskar, Parvati's fiancé
 Achyut Potdar
 Chandrakant Gokhale as Parvati's father
 Babban
 Ameeta
 Ranjit Kapoor
 Mirchandani
 Shashi Sharma
 Rahman Naushad
 Uday Dhruv
 Poornima
 Anant Jog as Inspector Shinde
 Ravi Patwardhan as Vidyarthi, journalist

Soundtrack

The songs in the film have been composed by Karthik Raja and the lyrics are written by Mehboob and Ila Arun.

Critical response
Taran Adarsh of IndiaFM gave the film 1 star out of 5, writing "On the whole, GRAHAN is a weak film in all respects. Lack of proper publicity, not-too-hot star cast and dull initial response will prove unfavourable for the film." Sukanya Verma of Rediff.com wrote "Grahan doesn't give any sign of being a long-in-the-making project. In a nutshell, Grahan misfires for the want of a tight script and hard-hitting characters."

Accolades 
Filmfare RD Burman Award for New Music Talent - Karthik Raja

References

External links

Films about rape in India
2001 films
2000s Hindi-language films
2001 drama films
Films scored by Karthik Raja
Indian courtroom films